Weightlifting competitions at the 2015 Pan American Games in Toronto was held from July 11 to 15 at the General Motors Centre (Oshawa Sports Centre) in Oshawa. Due to naming rights the arena was as the latter for the duration of the games. A total of fifteen weightlifting events were held: eight for men and seven for women.

Venue

The competitions will take place at the General Motors Centre (Oshawa Sports Centre) located about in the city of Oshawa, about 60 kilometers from the athletes village. The arena will have a reduced capacity (from its normal of about 5,500) of about 3,000 people per session. The venue will also host boxing competitions later during the games.

Competition schedule
The following is the competition schedule for the weightlifting competitions:

Medal table

Medalists

Men's events

Women's events

Participating nations
A total of 24 countries have qualified athletes. The number of athletes a nation has entered is in parentheses beside the name of the country.

Qualification

A total of 125 weightlifters (69 male and 56 women) were able to qualify to compete at the games. Qualification was done at the 2013 and 2014 Pan American Championships, where nations had points assigned per athlete's finishing position. The totals of both Championships were added and quotas were then awarded to the top 20 men's teams and 18 women's teams. A further two wildcards (one for each gender) was awarded.

See also
Weightlifting at the 2016 Summer Olympics

References

External links
Results book (archived)

 
Events at the 2015 Pan American Games
Pan American Games
2015